Peter Paul Buehning Jr. (born April 29, 1954) is an American former handball player who competed in the 1976 Summer Olympics.

He was born in Boston and is the older brother of James Buehning.

In 1976 he was part of the American team which finished tenth in the Olympic tournament. He played three matches and scored one goal.

External links
 profile

1954 births
Living people
American male handball players
Olympic handball players of the United States
Handball players at the 1976 Summer Olympics